W/O V. Varaprasad  is a 1997 Telugu romantic thriller film, produced by Ram Gopal Varma and directed by Vamsy.
The film stars Vineeth and J. D. Chakravarthy. The film revolves around a romantic drama suspense story. The songs were penned by Sirivennela Seetharama Sastry.

Cast 

Vineeth as Varaprasad
J. D. Chakravarthy as Thyagaraju
S. P. Balasubrahmanyam as Varaprasad Grandfather
Avani as Bhuvaneshwari
Mallikarjuna Rao
Krishna Bhagavaan
J. V. Ramana Murthi as Lawyer
Suthivelu
Subbaraya Sharma
Kallu Chidambaram
Krishna Rao
Gundu Hanumantha Rao
Isha Koppikar
Alphonsa

Awards 
 Nandi Award for Best Audiographer - M. Ravi

Soundtrack 

The soundtrack was composed by M. M. Keeravaani and all lyrics were written by Sirivennela Seetharama Sastry.

Reception 
The film was reviewed by Zamin Ryot. A critic from Andhra Today wrote that "From a noted duo like Producer/director Ramgopal Verma and Vamsi, the former as an eminent director of national repute and the latter noted for his finesse, a movie like W/o V.Varaprasad is a big disappointment, to put it mildly".

References

External links
 

1997 films
1990s Telugu-language films
Films scored by M. M. Keeravani
Films directed by Vamsy